Sir William Spencer Philip Trower, styled Mr Justice Trower, is a British High Court judge.

Legal career 
Trower completed his Graduate Diploma in Law in 1982 at City, University of London. Later completing his Master's degree at the University of Oxford in 1981.

He would be called to the Bar in 1983 by Lincoln's Inn and was appointed King's Counsel in 2001.

Trower acted as a Company Director of' Insolvency Lawyers Association' between August 2005 and April 2018.

In 2007, he was appointed as a Deputy High Court Judge of the Chancery division until 2019.

In 2009, he became a Bencher for Lincoln's Inn.

Trower would be appointed as a High Court judge in 2019 and was assigned to the Chancery Division.

He received the customary Knight Bachelor in 2020 by the late monarch Queen Elizabeth II.

Personal life 
Trower was born on 28 December 1959 in London, England.

He married Mary Louise Chastel De Boinville in 1986, with whom he has four daughters.

References 

Knights Bachelor
Chancery Division judges
Alumni of Christ Church, Oxford
Alumni of City, University of London
Members of Lincoln's Inn
English King's Counsel
21st-century King's Counsel
1959 births
Living people
People educated at Eton College